The 354th Bombardment Squadron is an inactive United States Air Force unit.  Its last was assigned to the 301st Bombardment Group, stationed at Geiger Field, Washington.  It was inactivated on 13 March 1942.

History
Activated as a B-17 Flying Fortress heavy bomb squadron.    Inactivated while in training status; personnel and equipment reassigned to 32d Bombardment Squadron and unit inactivated.

Lineage
 Constituted 354th Bombardment Squadron (Heavy) on 28 January 1942
 Activated on 3 February 1942
 Disbanded on 16 March 1942

Assignments
 301st Bombardment Group, 3 February-16 March 1942

Stations
 Geiger Field, Washington, 3 February-16 March 1942

Aircraft
 B-17 Flying Fortress, 1942

References

 

Military units and formations established in 1942
Bombardment squadrons of the United States Army Air Forces